The Luodong Night Market is a night market in Luodong Township, Yilan County, Taiwan.

Features
The night market offers local snacks and fashionable shops. Local snacks range from mutton herbal soup, iced tapioca with red bean stuffed, rice noodle thick soup and Yilan specialties, such as ox-tongue-shaped pastry, smoked duckling etc.

Transportation
The market is accessible within walking distance south west of Luodong Station of the Taiwan Railways Administration or Luodong Transfer Station, which is located directly behind Luodong railway station, via the Guoguang/Capital/Kamalan Bus.

See also
 List of night markets in Taiwan

References

Buildings and structures in Yilan County, Taiwan
Night markets in Taiwan
Tourist attractions in Yilan County, Taiwan